The Brunei Darussalam Maritime Museum is a museum located at Kota Batu, Brunei.

Background 
The museum is located within the historical area of Kota Batu. The building is a short walk to the Malay Technology Museum.

The construction began in December 2006 and completed sometime in 2008. However, delay caused it to only be opened to public after seven years. The museum was officially launched by His Royal Highness Crown Prince Al-Muhtadee Billah on March 23, 2015. The construction costed around five million in Brunei Dollars.

Exhibits 
The museum comprises three galleries. Two of the galleries are for permanent exhibition where as the third gallery is for temporary exhibition.

The first gallery is called 'the Brunei Shipwreck' and displays a selection from the 13,500 artefacts recovered from a shipwreck site about 32 nautical miles from the coast of Brunei back in 1997. The collection, thus the artefacts displayed in this gallery, consist of foreign ceramics dating back to the 15th and 16th centuries. This gallery is the de facto focal point, thus a permanent exhibition, of the museum.

The second gallery is named 'Kota Batu as a Trading Centre'. This exhibition is the manifestation of the development of Kota Batu as an important centre of human activities in Brunei within the 14th and 17th centuries. The exhibits include the models of foreign ships that came to Brunei for trade during those times as well as selected local cultural items. This is also a permanent exhibition of the museum.

The third gallery houses temporary exhibition. At the time of the museum's launch, this gallery displayed Quanzhou Maritime Museum's Maritime Silk Road exhibition and focused on the trade relation between Brunei and China during the high days of the Maritime Silk Road.

See also 
 List of museums in Brunei

References 

Museums in Brunei